Nuestra Belleza Baja California  Sur 2009 was held at the Hotel Presidente Intercontinental in Loas Cabos, Baja California Sur in summer 2009. At the conclusion of the final night of competition Giovanna Martínez of La Paz was crowned the winner. Martínez was crowned by outgoing Nuestra Belleza Baja California Sur winner Estrella Navarro. Eight contestants competed for the title.

Results

Placements

Contestants

References

External links
Official Website

Baja California Sur, 2009
Nuestra Belleza, 2009
2009 in Mexico